Soleil Ho (born ) is an American chef, food writer, podcaster, and restaurant critic. Formerly co-host of the podcast The Racist Sandwich,
Ho became the food critic at the San Francisco Chronicle in 2019, replacing Michael Bauer. Ho left the position in 2023, becoming a part of the Chronicles opinion desk.

Life and career 
Born into a Vietnamese-American family, Ho was raised in New York and graduated from Stuyvesant High School in 2005. According to Ho, they were embarrassed as a child by the "brothy, weirdly fishy" dishes that their family ate, at least in part because of how other children might react.  Ho graduated from Grinnell College in 2009. 

As a chef, Ho has worked at restaurants in New Orleans, Minneapolis, Portland, Oregon, and Puerto Vallarta, where their mother owned a restaurant.

In 2019, they replaced Michael Bauer, who retired after 32 years as the restaurant critic for the San Francisco Chronicle. Ho has joked that Bauer, their predecessor at the newspaper, held the job since they were "not even a fetus".

Literary works 
Ho is careful about the connotations of the words they select. A specific example is that they do not use the term "kaffir lime" because kaffir is a racial slur in South Africa. More generally, they do not think that "ethnic" food is a legitimate concept. Ho says "The imprecision of the word—and the assumption that it doesn’t apply equally to people and cuisines associated with Europe or white America—gives me such a headache." They consider terms like "sustainable," "responsibly grown" and "farm-to-table" to be marketing buzzwords that are too often abused.

Ho mentions poet and essayist Hanif Abdurraqib, food critic Ruth Reichl and newspaper critic-at-large Wesley Morris as among their influences. Ho says that they want to write about restaurants that "tell a story" which may focus on "race, gender, class or the culture of the Bay Area".

They co-authored Meal with Blue Delliquanti. The book is described as a "graphic novel on culinary mentorship, queer romance, and eating insects". 

Concerned about their legacy in a high profile position, Ho commented, "What if I screw up and no one ever hires a queer woman of color for a role like this again?"

References

External links
Soleil Ho: writer on the fish sauce beat

Year of birth missing (living people)
Living people
Stuyvesant High School alumni
Grinnell College alumni
San Francisco Chronicle people
American restaurant critics
American writers of Vietnamese descent
American LGBT people of Asian descent
American LGBT writers
LGBT people from New York (state)
21st-century American writers
American food writers
Writers from New York City
American podcasters